Samuel Allen Rice (January 27, 1828 – July 6, 1864) was born in Cattaraugus, New York. He attended Franklin College (New Athens, Ohio) in Ohio and then graduated from Union College at Schenectady, New York in 1849. Then in 1851, he moved to Oskaloosa, Iowa in Mahaska County, where he practiced law, was county attorney, and then served as the second Attorney General of Iowa in 1856–1861 on behalf of the Republican Party.

In the American Civil War, he was a colonel in the 33rd Iowa Volunteer Infantry which was mustered into U.S. Army service on October 4, 1862 within Mahaska County. He fought to open the Yazoo River for navigation, and then he commanded the 2nd Brigade, 13th Division, XIII Corps at Helena, Arkansas. In August 1863, he was appointed Brigadier General in the U.S. Volunteers.  On April 30, 1864 at Jenkins' Ferry, Arkansas, he was mortally wounded and then was returned to his home state of Iowa.  He died at Oskaloosa, Iowa, July 6, 1864 and was interred at Forest Cemetery in Oskaloosa.

Rice County, Kansas was named in his honor. He was the older brother of Union general Elliott Warren Rice.

See also

 List of Iowa Attorneys General

References

External links
 

Iowa Attorneys General
Iowa Republicans
1828 births
1864 deaths
Union Army generals
People from Cattaraugus County, New York
People from Oskaloosa, Iowa
People of Iowa in the American Civil War
19th-century American politicians
United States politicians killed during the Civil War
District attorneys in Iowa
Union military personnel killed in the American Civil War